Fernando Andrade Sotomayor (1579 – 21 January 1655) was a Roman Catholic prelate who served as Archbishop of Santiago de Compostela (1645–1655), Archbishop (Personal Title) of Sigüenza (1640–1645), Archbishop of Burgos (1631–1640), and Bishop of Palencia (1628–1631).

Biography
Fernando Andrade Sotomayor was born in Vilagarcía de Arousa, Spain. On 29 May 1628, he was appointed during the papacy of Pope Urban VIII as Bishop of Palencia. On 10 September 1628, he was consecrated bishop by Diego Guzmán de Haros, Archbishop of Seville, with Luis Camargo Pacheco, Auxiliary Bishop of Seville, and Juan de la Sal, Auxiliary Bishop of Seville, serving as co-consecrators. On 10 November 1631, he was appointed during the papacy of Pope Urban VIII as Archbishop of Burgos. On 10 September 1640, he was appointed during the papacy of Pope Urban VIII as Archbishop (Personal Title) of Sigüenza. On 20 March 1645, he was appointed during the papacy of Pope Innocent X as Archbishop of Santiago de Compostela. He served as Archbishop of Santiago de Compostela until his death on 21 January 1655. While bishop, he was the principal consecrator of Gonzalo Sánchez de Somoza Quiroga, Bishop of Mondoñedo (1639), and Juan Pérez de Vega, Bishop of Tui (1649).

References

External links and additional sources
 (for Chronology of Bishops) 
 (for Chronology of Bishops) 
 (for Chronology of Bishops) 
 (for Chronology of Bishops) 
 (for Chronology of Bishops) 
 (for Chronology of Bishops) 
 (for Chronology of Bishops) 
 (for Chronology of Bishops) 

17th-century Roman Catholic archbishops in Spain
1579 births
1655 deaths
Bishops appointed by Pope Urban VIII
Bishops appointed by Pope Innocent X